The SSh-39 and SSh-40 (both from стальной шлем, stal'noy shlem) were two similar designs of steel combat helmet designed and used by the Soviet Union's Red Army. They were the main forms of helmet in use during World War II and had only superficial differences.

SSh-39 

The SSh-39 was of simple, more modern design, and was much easier to manufacture than the SSh-36.  The SSh-39 would be the standard design for Soviet helmets for the next 29 years, with only minor changes occurring during that time.  It is also the design for the helmet on the Tomb of the Unknown Soldier in Moscow. The helmet was produced primarily in three factories, the Stalingrad Tractor Factory (designated CT in the ink stamp), the Red October Factory (ЗКО) also in Stalingrad, and the Lysva Metallurgical Factory (LMZ). The first liner was an eight-finger leather liner, similar to those of the German  M35 to M42 Stahlhelm designs.  Next came a short production of an eight-finger liner made of Gralex.  The final version of the SSh-39 liner was cloth, similar to the SSh-36 liner.  All three variations of the liner were suspended from the helmet by three metal tabs, which were riveted to the shell near the top.  This helmet, like the earlier SSh-36, saw action in numerous campaigns before it was phased out in 1942 in favor of the SSh-40.

SSh-40 

The SSh-40 was the most commonly seen in-service helmet used by the Soviet Union during World War II.  The only external difference between the SSh-39 and the SSh-40 was the six rivets near the bottom of the helmet, as opposed to the three near the top of the SSh-39 shell.  Rivet placement of the SSh-40 was due to a newly introduced liner, simpler and sturdier than the previous versions.  The liner consisted of three (later four during post-war) cloth or oilcloth pads connected with a cotton drawstring for size adjustment.  The chinstrap was cloth and connected to D-rings on each side of the shell by tabs.  The chinstrap ends were connected with a slip buckle, and a semi-circular metal piece was clamped to the end of the long chinstrap. Unlike the SSh-36 and SSh-39, the SSh-40 was only manufactured in three sizes, 1–3. The SSh-40 was supplemented by the SSh-60  which entered service in the 1960s and finally replaced by the SSh-68, though many remained in use throughout the Soviet period and beyond. The SSh-40 is commonly confused with the Hungarian M50 helmet.

References

Clawson, R Russian Helmets: From Kaska to Stalshlyem 1916-2001 Bender Publishing

World War II military equipment of the Soviet Union
Soviet military uniforms
Combat helmets of Russia
Military equipment introduced in the 1930s